Massilia lurida is a Gram-negative and rod-shaped and motile bacterium from the genus Massilia which has been isolated from soil from the Inner Mongolia Autonomous Region in China.

References

Further reading

External links
Type strain of Massilia lurida at BacDive -  the Bacterial Diversity Metadatabase

Burkholderiales
Bacteria described in 2013